Marie Bay is a fjord on the Northwest tip of Melville Island.
Marie Bay lies on the part of Melville Island that is in the Northwest Territories.
The Eastern part of the Island is in Nunavut.

Oil sands deposits were found in the Marie Bay region.
The oil sands deposit are estimated to hold 100 to 250 million barrels of oil.

References

Bays of the Northwest Territories